Andrew Michael McPartland (25 November 1915 – 2 May 1990) was an Australian rules footballer who played for the Essendon Football Club in the Victorian Football League (VFL).

McPartland enlisted in the Royal Australian Air Force in January 1940, serving until the end of World War II. It was during this period of service that he played his single senior game for Essendon, appearing as 19th man in their Round 16 1941 match against Hawthorn.

Notes

External links 
		

1915 births
1990 deaths
Australian rules footballers from Victoria (Australia)
Essendon Football Club players
Royal Australian Air Force personnel of World War II
Royal Australian Air Force airmen